Gregor Högler (born June 27, 1972) is a male javelin thrower and coach from Austria, vice president of Österreichischer Leichtathletik Verband. His personal best was 84.03 metres, achieved in July 1999 in Kapfenberg. This is the national record.

Seasonal bests by year
1995 - 78.54
1997 - 83.00
1998 - 81.89
1999 - 84.03 NR
2000 - 82.03
2001 - 81.98
2002 - 80.52
2003 - 77.56
2005 - 68.72
2006 - 73.53

Achievements

References

External links

1972 births
Living people
Austrian male javelin throwers
Athletes (track and field) at the 2000 Summer Olympics
Olympic athletes of Austria
Universiade medalists in athletics (track and field)
Universiade silver medalists for Austria
Universiade bronze medalists for Austria
Medalists at the 1995 Summer Universiade
Medalists at the 1997 Summer Universiade
Medalists at the 1999 Summer Universiade
Austrian sports coaches
Athletics (track and field) coaches